Major-General Lord Charles Wellesley (16 January 1808 – 9 October 1858, Apsley House) was a British politician, soldier and courtier. He was the second son of Arthur Wellesley, 1st Duke of Wellington, and Catherine Pakenham.

He was educated at Eton College, and matriculated at Christ Church, Oxford in 1824, aged 16. He was rusticated by the Dean of Christ Church, Samuel Smith, transferring in 1826 to Trinity College, Cambridge .

He married Augusta Sophia Anne Pierrepont, daughter of The Hon. Henry Pierrepont, on 9 July 1844. They had six children:

 Arthur Wellesley (5 May 1845 – 7 July 1846)
 Major Henry Wellesley, 3rd Duke of Wellington (5 April 1846 – 8 June 1900)
 Lady Victoria Alexandrina Wellesley (2 April 1847 – 31 July 1933)
 Colonel Arthur Charles Wellesley, 4th Duke of Wellington (15 March 1849 – 18 June 1934)
 Lady Mary Angela Wellesley (21 October 1850 – 26 April 1936)
 Georgina Wellesley (15 May 1853 – 3 February 1880)

Wellesley represented the Conservative Party as the Member of Parliament (MP) for South Hampshire from 1842 to 1852, and the MP for Windsor from 1852 to 1855. He was also a Chief Equerry and Clerk Marshal to Queen Victoria. Lord Charles died aged 50 in 1858.

When his older brother, Arthur Wellesley, 2nd Duke of Wellington, died in 1884 with no heirs, Lord Charles's second child, Henry Wellesley (as the oldest surviving son) inherited his uncle's dukedom as Duke of Wellington. When Henry also died childless in 1900, the peerage passed to Lord Charles' third son Arthur Wellesley, Henry's brother.

References

External links

1808 births
1858 deaths
Alumni of Christ Church, Oxford
Alumni of Trinity College, Cambridge
People educated at Eton College
Charles Wellesley, Lord
Children of prime ministers of the United Kingdom
Members of the Parliament of the United Kingdom for English constituencies
British Army generals
Younger sons of dukes
UK MPs 1841–1847
UK MPs 1847–1852
UK MPs 1852–1857
Non-inheriting heirs presumptive